Mount McGee is a  mountain summit located west of the crest of the Sierra Nevada mountain range, in Fresno County of central California, United States. This geographical feature was named for William John McGee (1853–1912), well-known American geologist and anthropologist. This mountain's name has been officially adopted by the United States Board on Geographic Names. The first ascent of the summit was made in July 1923 by Roger N. Burnham, Robert E. Brownlee, Ralph H. Brandt, and Leonard Keeler.

Climate
According to the Köppen climate classification system, Mount McGee is located in an alpine climate zone. Most weather fronts originate in the Pacific Ocean, and travel east toward the Sierra Nevada mountains. As fronts approach, they are forced upward by the peaks, causing them to drop their moisture in the form of rain or snowfall onto the range (orographic lift). Precipitation runoff from this mountain drains into tributaries of the San Joaquin River.

Climbing

Established climbing routes:

 South chute –  – Probably route of 1923 first ascent
 West face – class 2 – FA 1933 by Glen Dawson, Neil Ruge, Bala Ballantine
 North chute – class 4 – FA 1930 by Glen Dawson, Charles Dodge, Jules M. Eichorn, John Olmstead

See also

 List of mountain peaks of California

Gallery

References

External links

 Weather forecast: Mount McGee

Mountains of Fresno County, California
Mountains of Kings Canyon National Park
North American 3000 m summits
Mountains of Northern California
Sierra Nevada (United States)